Tú Sin Mí is the ninth studio album of Puerto Rican singer Ednita Nazario. It was released in 1986.

Track listing
 "Que Me Ame Más"
 "Mas Que Nunca, Hoy"
 "El Dolor de Tu Presencia"
 "Te Amaría"
 "Tú Sin Mi"
 "Alma de Gitana"
 "No Hay Nadie"
 "Tema Para Una Voz Triste y Un Piano"
 "Está Herido Mi Amor"
 "Te Borraré"

Singles
 Tú Sin Mí
 Alma de Gitana
 El Dolor de Tu Presencia
 Que Me Ame Más

Personnel
 Produced by Rudy Peréz

Ednita Nazario albums
1986 albums
Albums produced by Rudy Pérez